Gordon James Russell (December 22, 1859 – September 14, 1919) was a United States representative from Texas and a United States district judge of the United States District Court for the Eastern District of Texas.

Russell was nominated by President William H. Taft on May 27, 1910, to a seat vacated by David E. Bryant. He was confirmed by the United States Senate on June 6, 1910, and received commission the same day. Russell's service was terminated on September 14, 1919, due to death.

Education and career

Born on December 22, 1859, in Huntsville, Madison County, Alabama, Russell attended the common schools, the Sam Bailey Institute in Griffin, Georgia and Crawford High School in Dalton, Georgia. He received an Artium Baccalaureus degree in 1877 from the University of Georgia and read law the same year. He taught school in Dalton. He was admitted to the bar and entered private practice in Dalton from 1878 to 1879. He was in private practice in Texas from 1879 to 1884. He was in private practice in Van Zandt County, Texas from 1884 to 1895. He was a Judge of the Van Zandt County Court 1890 to 1892. He resumed private practice in Willsport, Texas starting in 1892. He was district attorney for the Seventh Judicial District of Texas from 1892 to 1896. He continued private practice in Tyler, Texas starting in 1895. He was a Judge of the Texas District Court for the Seventh Judicial District from 1896 to 1902.

Congressional service

Russell was elected as a Democrat to the United States House of Representatives of the 57th United States Congress to fill the vacancy caused by the death of United States Representative Reese C. De Graffenreid. He was reelected to the 58th United States Congress and to the three succeeding Congresses and served from November 4, 1902, to June 14, 1910, when he resigned to accept a federal judicial post.

Federal judicial service

Russell was nominated by President William Howard Taft on May 27, 1910, to a seat on the United States District Court for the Eastern District of Texas vacated by Judge David Ezekiel Bryant. He was confirmed by the United States Senate on June 6, 1910, and received his commission the same day. His service terminated on September 14, 1919, due to his death in Kerrville, Kerr County, Texas. He was interred in Oakwood Cemetery in Tyler, Smith County, Texas.

References

Sources

External links
Gordon James Russell entry at The Political Graveyard

 
 
 

1859 births
1919 deaths
Burials in Texas
Georgia (U.S. state) lawyers
Judges of the United States District Court for the Eastern District of Texas
Politicians from Huntsville, Alabama
Texas lawyers
United States district court judges appointed by William Howard Taft
20th-century American judges
University of Georgia alumni
Democratic Party members of the United States House of Representatives from Texas
19th-century American politicians
Lawyers from Huntsville, Alabama